Ivan Vasiliev (born 7 September 1984 in Kostroma) is a Russian triathlete.

At the 2012 Summer Olympics men's triathlon on Tuesday 7 August he placed 13th.

References 

1984 births
Living people
Russian male triathletes
Triathletes at the 2012 Summer Olympics
Olympic triathletes of Russia
20th-century Russian people
21st-century Russian people